|}

The Buckhounds Stakes is a Listed flat horse race in Great Britain open to horses aged four years or older. It is run at Ascot over a distance of 1 mile 3 furlongs and 211 yards, and it is scheduled to take place each year in May.
The race was first run in 2005 over 11½ furlongs, increased to 12 furlongs the following year.

Records 
Most successful horse:
 No horse has won this race more than once

Leading jockey (2 wins):
 Ryan Moore - Spanish Moore (2008), Aiken (2012)
 Jimmy Fortune - Duncan (2009), Agent Murphy (2015)
 Oisin Murphy - Salouen (2019), Dashing Willoughby (2020)

Leading trainer (3 wins):
 John Gosden - Duncan (2009), Aiken (2012), Gatewood (2014)
 Roger Varian - Alainmaar (2011), Ektihaam (2013), Barsanti (2018)

Winners

See also 
 Horse racing in Great Britain
 List of British flat horse races

References
Racing Post:

Flat races in Great Britain
Ascot Racecourse
Open middle distance horse races
Recurring sporting events established in 2005
2005 establishments in England